Partas Transportation Co., Inc. is a bus transportation company in the Philippines. It operates a 24/7 service for passengers and freight (known as "waybills") between Metro Manila and northwest Luzon (the Ilocos corridor), with services also running to the Cordilleras in Baguio, Bangued, Abra, and also running to the south including Occidental Mindoro and Bicol Region in Naga City. Partas also offers chartered service for tour groups.

Etymology

The name "Partas" was derived from the term "Satrap", an ancient Persian language word for "governor" (since Luis Chavit Singson, the owner, served as governor of Ilocos Sur for many years), spelled in reverse or palindrome,. "Satrap" also refers to the name of the construction business owned and managed by Partas' owner/operator. Partas also sounds like "pardas," an Ilocano term for "being fast" or "speed."

History

Partas was founded on July 25, 1989 and started its operations in 1991, a time when Philippine Rabbit and rival Fariñas Transit ruled the Ilocos routes; and with millionaire Santiago Rondaris' Times Transit shut down for good due to labor disputes which later became Dominion Bus Lines; and St. Joseph was sidelined by hard times. Partas Bus Lines, as a company, was incorporated by Luis Chavit Singson and Rolito Go at Laoag (Ilocos Norte). Even as a new player in the industry back then, Partas has attracted the riding public with its state-of-the-art buses powered by Nissan Diesel and MAN engines; with the distinctive blue and white livery, and the Road Runner character from Looney Tunes, their standard emblem, adorning the front and sides of their buses.

Partas is one of two bus companies in the Ilocos Region to have ever fielded a double-decker bus (the other being Fariñas).

The principal provincial terminals are at Laoag, Vigan, Candon, Bangued, Baguio, San Fernando, La Union, and, starting in 2014, a sub-station in Pagudpud, Ilocos Norte.

In Metro Manila, the main hub is at Cubao, Quezon City, which deploys trips to majority of its provincial destinations, except for Baguio.

Trips to and from the majority of its provincial destinations, except for Baguio, are available via their terminal in Pasay. One of the latest routes added to Pasay terminal is Pasay to Pagudpud, and vice versa.

The latest terminal within Metro Manila was opened in Sampaloc district of Manila City. This terminal principally caters to goods traders in Binondo and Divisoria district of Manila, and students in Manila's University Belt who hail from Laoag City, Bangued, and Pagudpud.

Partas also has inter-provincial trips in Northern Luzon, running between Baguio, Vigan, Laoag, Bangued and San Fernando, La Union.

Fleet
Partas operates around 300 buses. These buses are an assortment—from locally-manufactured to imports. The locally-manufactured buses are built by Del Monte Motor Works using chassis and engine from MAN and Hino; while imported buses included Golden Dragon (select models) and Zhongtong from China.

The list includes:

 Golden Dragon XML6102 "Splendour"
Golden Dragon XML6122J38Y "Triumph 2.0"
 Golden Dragon XML6103 "Phoenix"
 Golden Dragon XML6122 
 Golden Dragon XML6127 
 Golden Dragon XML6129J18 "Navigator"
 Zhongtong LCK6118H "Elegance"
 Zhongtong LCK6128H "Magnate"
 Golden Dragon XML6122J18 "Triumph"

Former:
 Golden Dragon XML6129 "Grand Cruiser"
 Hyundai Universe Space Luxury 
 Higer KLQ6109 Koyo Motor
 Man AMC Tourist Star R39 18.350 
 Yutong ZK6107HA 
 Hino RM2PSS DMMW DM 10 
 Hino RM2PSS DMMW DM 11 
 Hino RM2PSS DMMW DM 12 
 Hino RM2PSS DMMW DM 14 
 Hino RM2PSS DMMW DM 16
 Nissan Diesel Euro Trans JA430SAN

Branding

Livery 
The company's official logo is Road Runner which is displayed, either standing or running, on most buses, with the name 'PARTAS' written in capital letters. All buses vary in livery design, but are predominantly blue (light and dark), red and white.

Fleet numbering 
The buses are numbered with 4 or 5 digits, with the number 8 being placed on the first and last digit (e.g. 8**8 and 8***8).

Fare classes

Partas has employed various fare classes, which are sequenced below from the least to the most priced. All buses include air-conditioning.

Luxury
Deluxe (28 or 31-seat buses; spacious leg-room equipped for Pagudpud, Laoag, Abra, Baguio and Vigan trips)
Standard (sold and advertized as 'Air-conditioned'; 45 or 49-seat buses)

They also operate express buses, with only one stopover.

Destinations

Metro Manila 
 Cubao, Quezon City
 Pasay
 Sampaloc, Manila

Provincial destinations 
 Mabalacat, Pampanga (Dau Mabalacat Bus Terminal)
 San Fernando City, La Union*
 Candon, Ilocos Sur  *
 Vigan City, Ilocos Sur  *
 Bangued, Abra *
 Laoag City, Ilocos Norte 
 Pagudpud, Ilocos Norte *
 Baguio
 Bolinao, Pangasinan
 Alaminos, Pangasinan
 Tuguegarao, Cagayan *
 Santiago, Isabela
 San Jose, Occidental Mindoro
 Batangas City
 Naga, Camarines Sur
*All buses from Metro Manila will pass through TPLEX depending on the exit.

Inter-provincial 
 Baguio - Laoag
 Baguio - Vigan
 Baguio - Bangued (placards and LEDs are shown as ABRA)
 Baguio - San Fernando, La Union (LEDs and placards are shown as La Union)
 Baguio - Bolinao
 Santa Cruz - Vigan
 Laoag City - Rosales (via Urdaneta)
 Tuguegarao - Sta. Teresita
 Tuguegarao - Santiago (via Ilagan)
 Baggao - Santiago (soon)
 Baggao - Paoay (soon)

Former destinations
Aparri, Cagayan
Junction Luna, Apayao
San Fernando, Pampanga
Cabanatuan, Nueva Ecija
Olongapo, Zambales

References

Bus companies of the Philippines